Chen Deming (born 1949) is a former the President of Association for Relations Across the Taiwan Straits of the People's Republic of China.

Early life
Chen was born in Shanghai in 1949. He went on to receive a Bachelor's Degree in Economics, a Master's Degree from the Hopkins-Nanjing Center, and later a Doctorate in Administration from Nanjing University Business School. In 1969 he joined the workforce and in September 1974, Chen joined the Communist Party of China.

Political life
Chen was Mayor and later CPC Committee Secretary of Suzhou. He then was the Governor of Shaanxi from 2004 to 2006. Then he was a Deputy at the National Development and Reform Commission, where he largely dealt with matters pertaining to China's energy policy.

He was the Minister of the Chinese Ministry of Commerce from 2007 to 2013. He was appointed to the post at the Standing Committee of the National People's Congress on December 29, 2007.

ARATS Presidency

2013 Taiwan visit

In end of November 2013, Chen led a delegation for an 8-day visit to Taiwan, his first trip to Taiwan after being appointed as the head of ARATS. He will visit Pingtung County, Kaohsiung City, Tainan City, Chiayi County, Taichung City, Hsinchu County, Taipei City and New Taipei City.

Upon arrival at Taoyuan International Airport, Chen was greeted by Straits Exchange Foundation (SEF) Vice Chairman Kao Koong-lian. He then proceeded for a luncheon hosted by Taoyuan County Magistrate John Wu. Chen and the delegation continued to visit a free-trade harbor zone at Taoyuan Aerotropolis and then met with SEF Chairman Lin Join-sane at SEF Headquarter at Zhongshan District, Taipei.

In Kaohsiung City, Chen and delegation toured the Port of Kaohsiung on a boat which was flying the flag of the Republic of China on the back side.

2014 Taiwan visit
In end of February 2014, Chen and delegation visited Taiwan for the 10th round of cross-strait negotiation with the SEF. Both sides signed agreements on meteorological and seismic data sharing. During the visit, he also met with Wang Yu-chi, the head of Mainland Affairs Council. At the final leg of the 3-day visit, Chen, accompanied by SEF Chairman Lin Join-sane and Taipei Mayor Hau Lung-bin, visited the Taipei Zoo to see Yuan Zai panda whose parents were sent by PRC government in 2008 to Taiwan.

References

Living people
1949 births
Mayors of Suzhou
Governors of Shaanxi
People's Republic of China politicians from Shanghai
Political office-holders in Jiangsu
Nanjing University alumni
Ministers of Commerce of the People's Republic of China
Chinese Communist Party politicians from Shanghai